Gordon Williams may refer to:

 Gordon Williams (writer) (1934–2017), Scottish author
 Gordon Williams (footballer) (born 1929), English footballer
 Gordon Williams (lawyer), English lawyer
 Gordon E. Williams (born 1935), U.S. Air Force officer